Kamisinga is a settlement in Kenya's Bungoma County.

References 

Populated places in Western Province (Kenya)
Bungoma County